Dundee University RFC is a rugby union club based in Dundee, Scotland. The club operates a men's team and a women's team. Both currently play in the university leagues.

History

Recently the men's side has had international players from Turkey and the Cayman Islands in their ranks. Another player Neil McComb played for Ireland Under 21 and Ulster Rugby.

The men's side are raising money for the Oddballs charity during the Lions tour of South Africa.

Sides

The men's side runs 3 XVs.

Honours

Men

 Scottish University Sevens
 Champions (1): 1994
 Scottish Conference 1A
 Champions (2): 2007–08, 2011–12
 Scottish Conference 2A
 Champions (2): 2005–06, 2010–11

Women

 Scottish Conference 1A
 Champions (5): 2007–08, 2008–09, 2009–10, 2011–12, 2012–13
 Mull Sevens
 Champions (1): 2008

References

Rugby union in Dundee
Scottish rugby union teams
University and college rugby union clubs in Scotland